Kadeem Dacres (born August 25, 1991) is an American soccer player who currently plays as a winger.

Dacres was a Division 1 All American at UMBC. He turn professional in 2014 when he was drafted to the Chicago Fire during the 2014 Superdraft. He has played with Arizona United, Louisville City FC, FC Cincinnati, and Saint Louis FC. He has scored a total of 25 goals, with his most during the 2011–2012 season when he played with Jersey Express. He originally played at Mercer County Community College in 2010, transferred over to University of Maryland Baltimore County in 2011.

Career

College and amateur
Dacres played one year of college soccer at Mercer County Community College in 2010, before transferring to the University of Maryland Baltimore County in 2011. While at college, Dacres appeared for USL PDL side's Jersey Express in 2011 and 2012, and Reading United AC in 2013.

Professional career
Dacres was drafted 65th overall by Chicago Fire in the 2014 MLS SuperDraft. However, Dacres wasn't signed by the club.

Dacres signed with USL Pro club Arizona United on April 10, 2014.

Dacres signed with USL Pro club Louisville City FC on December 5, 2014 as one of the club's first three players ahead of their inaugural season in 2015.

Dacres signed with USL club FC Cincinnati on December 15, 2016 leading into the team's second season. Shortly after the end of the 2017 season, FC Cincinnati announced that they would not exercise Dacres' option for 2018.

On December 30, 2017, it was announced that Dacres would join Saint Louis FC ahead of their 2018 season. Saint Louis FC folded following the 2020 USL Championship season.

On March 11, 2021, Dacres joined USL Championship side Memphis 901.

References

External links 
 
 
 

1991 births
Living people
American soccer players
Association football midfielders
Chicago Fire FC draft picks
FC Cincinnati (2016–18) players
Jersey Express S.C. players
Louisville City FC players
Memphis 901 FC players
Phoenix Rising FC players
Reading United A.C. players
Saint Louis FC players
Sportspeople from Queens, New York
Soccer players from New York City
UMBC Retrievers men's soccer players
USL League Two players
USL Championship players
People from Rosedale, Queens